Cape Regional Medical Center, formerly Burdette Tomlin Memorial Hospital, is located at 2 Stone Harbor Boulevard in the Cape May Court House section of Middle Township, New Jersey, United States. It is the only hospital in Cape May County.

Cape Regional Health System is an integrated healthcare delivery system serving residents and visitors throughout Cape May County. The system includes Cape Regional Medical Center, three urgent care facilities, Cape Regional Physicians Associates with over 50 primary care providers and specialists delivering services in multiple locations throughout Cape May County, the Thomas and Claire Brodesser, Jr., Cancer Center, the Jane Osborne Center, Cape Regional Miracles Fitness and numerous freestanding outpatient facilities providing wound care, radiology, lab, and physical therapy services.

Cape Regional Medical Center is accredited by and received the Gold Seal of approval from The Joint Commission.

External links

 Cape Regional Medical Center

Hospital buildings completed in 1950
Hospitals in New Jersey
Buildings and structures in Cape May County, New Jersey
Hospitals established in 1950
Middle Township, New Jersey
1950 establishments in New Jersey